The 1925 Assumption Purple football team was an American football team that represented Assumption College of Sandwich, Ontario, Canada, during the 1925 college football season. Father O'Loane was the head coach, and Father V. Kennedy was the assistant coach. Kramer was the team captain.

Schedule

References

Assumption
Assumption Purple football